Ulish Booker (August 14, 1979) is a former offensive tackle.

Ulish began his football career in West Haven, Connecticut, playing for West Haven High School where he made the All-State team.  He went on to play college football for Michigan State University, and he was signed as an undrafted free agent by the Atlanta Falcons.  The Falcons cut Booker in 2003 before he played a single down in the NFL.

Booker would, however, eventually make his way back into the NFL on February 1, 2005, when he was signed by the Pittsburgh Steelers and allocated to NFL Europe where he played for the Amsterdam Admirals.

Ulish went on to become a starter with the Amsterdam Admirals, winning offensive MVP honors, and claiming victory in 2005 NFL Europe World Bowl XIII.

That same season, Booker returned to the Pittsburgh Steelers as a member of the team that won Super Bowl XL.

Booker added his name to a list of only five players to win World Bowl and Super Bowl rings in the same season.

On August 28, 2006, the Steelers placed Ulish Booker on the injured reserve list with a torn ACL.

Prior to playing in the NFL, the 6'7" and over 300-pound Booker was a substitute teacher in West Haven, Connecticut.

On April 1, 2008, Booker signed with the Toronto Argonauts of the Canadian Football League.

Ulish recently started First Foot Forward Family Solutions, a mentoring agency specializing in youth and families.

He currently resides in New Haven, Connecticut

He now coaches at St. Luke's School in New Canaan, Connecticut as the offensive line coach for the Storm.

References

External links
Toronto Argonauts bio

1979 births
Living people
People from West Haven, Connecticut
American football offensive tackles
Michigan State Spartans football players
Amsterdam Admirals players
Pittsburgh Steelers players